Paravankunnu is a suburb of Thiruvananthapuram, the capital of Kerala, India. Paravankunnu is situated between Ambalathara, Thiruvananthapuram and Kallattumukku.

Location
Paravankunnu is 5 km from the city centre. Privately owned and KSRTC buses plying in the Kovalam route from East Fort pass through Ambalathara. A bypass of National Highway 47 passes 2 km to the west of Paravankunnu. Nearest railway station is Thiruvananthapuram Central, around 5 km away. Nearest airport is Thiruvananthapuram International Airport, around 6 km away. Paravankunnu is a bustling residential region situated on the way from East Fort to Thiruvallam, in Thiruvananthapuram. The famous Pazhanchira Devi Temple and Childrens Hospital is situated here. The 2000-year-old Thiruvallam Sree Parasurama Temple at Thiruvallam is 3 km away from Paravankunnu.

Religion
The population of Paravankunnu mainly practices Hinduism and Islam.

References

External links
 Paravankunnu at Wikimapia 

Suburbs of Thiruvananthapuram